836 Squadron was a squadron of the Royal Navy's Fleet Air Arm.

History
836 Naval Air Squadron officially formed for the first time at Palisadoes, Jamaica, in March 1942 as a torpedo bomber reconnaissance squadron flying the Fairey Swordfish. It operated from HMS Buzzard at Palisadoes, Jamaica, in spring 1942, and it subsequently embarked on the Woolworth carrier  in June 1942 for the UK, where it joined RAF Coastal Command in January 1943 for operations in the English Channel from RAF Thorney Island. 836 returned aboard HMS Biter to be re-formed to provide personnel and aircraft for the MAC ships, 836 was later based at Maydown, known as HMS Shrike, in Northern Ireland, not far from Lough Foyle, and commanded by Acting Lieutenant Commander Ransford Slater. He took command in July 1942 and worked up the squadron at Thorney Island until March 1943 when it was based at Machrihanish.

Lieutenant Commander Slater
Slater had personally led the squadron's 'A' flight in the first attachment to MV Empire MacAlpine in April 1943 and he was the only regular Royal Navy officer in the unit, all others being wartime RNVR. Slater had recognised from the outset that successful operations required the aircrew and ship's crew to work together as a team. That was potentially a problem since the Royal Navy and the Merchant Navy had widely differing working practices and traditions.

"During the weeks of training, Slater was in his element. His leadership was evident in every aspect. His skill in unlocking the secrets of how to land on a floating postage-stamp were passed on to his pilots, while, at the same time, he made the team feel that their contribution to the success of the enterprise was vital.."

One thing he arranged was that the air party on the ships signed ships articles and hence placed themselves under the orders of the Ship's Master. For this they were supposed to receive one shilling per month and a bottle of beer per day. They got the beer – seven bottles every Sunday. It also entitled them to wear the small silver 'MN' lapel badge on their uniforms, which caused not a little upset with more traditional senior RN officers. Another of Slater's rules for the squadron was that flight commanders must have completed a full round trip under another flight commander before being eligible to take over.

The squadron operated the Fairey Swordfish Mark II and they were painted all white (apparently the best camouflage for daylight flight over water). Some flights got carried away and replaced the Royal Navy legend on the rear fuselage with Merchant Navy – to the consternation of some observers. With a flight for each of 19 ships, plus a few spare flights for training and relief, the squadron eventually grew to a strength of 91 aircraft, certainly a Fleet Air Arm record and probably a world one. Slater was awarded the military OBE for his efforts, particularly for landing on a MAC ship carrying 2 depth charges after his arrester hook had been torn away. He was killed by flying into powerlines near Derry on 28 June 1944.

Some of the crews and aircraft were lent to 816 Naval Air Squadron during the middle of 1944. 816 NAS were based at Perranporth Airfield and carried out anti-submarine patrols under the control of Coastal Command. The loan was due to the expected increase of U-boat activity in the Channel area as a result of the D-Day landings.

After VE-Day, 836 squadron was disbanded in July 1945.

Aircraft operated

Commanding officers

See also
List of Fleet Air Arm aircraft squadrons

References
Notes

Bibliography

 Sturtivant, Ray & Theo Ballance. The Squadrons of the Fleet Air Arm. Tonbridge, Kent, UK: Air Britain (Historians) Ltd, 1994. .

800 series Fleet Air Arm squadrons
Military units and formations established in 1943